Perlis FA State Football Team, also known as Perlis FA, is a football team based in Kangar, Perlis, Malaysia which is run and managed by the Perlis Football Association (PFA). The team was founded in 1963 and is currently suspended by FIFA from playing in the Malaysian football league. Before their suspension, the team played in the 2019 Malaysia Premier League. Year 2019 was the first ever year that Perlis did not enter any tournament in Malaysian League since 1963.

It was one of the 14 Malaysian state teams of the Malaysian football structure before the Malaysian football league demanded all teams competing in the country's top two leagues be run as professional clubs by 2021. Perlis FA is not run as a professional football club, but rather as a team that was funded and run by a Malaysian state football association that relied mostly on state government grants. The team was run was much like all other Malaysian state football teams competing in the old Malaysian football system before the year 2021. To outsiders who are not familiar with the Malaysian football system or league (before the year 2020), the team is simply known as Perlis FA because it was run by the Perlis Football Association. To those who follow Malaysian football on the other hand, the team was simply known as Perlis or Perlis State Football Team.

There were plans to privatize the team after Ahmad Amizal Shaifit Ahmad was elected PFA president in 2018, but the move did not materialise because the association fell into financial crisis the following year (in 2019). The financial crisis resulted in the team being suspended by FIFA for failing to settle salary arrears of players and coaches. Their participation in the Malaysian football league was subsequently cancelled. Stories of the financial crisis faced by the team were widely reported by the Malaysian media at the time.

History

Founded in 1963, the team has a long-standing rivalry with Kedah FA, the two northern teams collectively known as the "Northern Derby". Their home is the 20,000-seat Tuanku Syed Putra Stadium, built in 1995 to replace the Dato' Sheikh Ahmad Stadium.

Perlis had their first major success in the 2004 season, when they won the Malaysia Cup. They went on to win the Malaysian top tier league, the Malaysian Super League, in 2005. It would be the only time to date that the team would win the Malaysian top division, though they won another Malaysia Cup in 2006. Interestingly the team never won the Malaysia FA Cup, although they were beaten finalist three times in 2003, 2006 and 2007. The team had also won the Malaysian Charity Shield (which is also known as the Piala Sumbangsih) twice in 2007 and 2008.

As for continental tournaments, 2006 was their debut playing in the AFC Cup. They did qualify for the 2010 edition of the AFC Cup but withdrew from the competition.

Shahidan Kassim Era

Perlis FA's most successful era to date was during the time when Shahidan Kassim was president of the Perlis Football Association (PFA) from 1998 to 2013. Affectionately known as 'Pak Dan' by the people of Perlis, he is also a Malaysian politician and former Malaysian federal minister from Tambun Tulang, Perlis. He was instrumental in transforming Perlis into a force to be reckoned with in Malaysian football. His tenure as PFA president ended after the team, being a Malaysian state football team, has been struggling financially towards the end of his tenure of as the association's president. Perlis FA have so far not won any trophy after winning the Malaysia Charity Shield in 2008.

FIFA Suspension
The team is currently serving a two-year FIFA suspension for failing to settle salary arrears of players and coaches in 2019. It was however not clear whether FIFA had suspended PFA as the Malaysian state team or the PFA as the association which governs football in the Malaysian state of Perlis because both entities had used the same name before this. With some Perlis-based clubs such as Perlis United FC and Northern Lions FC are still competing and participating in the Malaysian football league after the suspension, the FIFA suspension could be interpreted as a suspension on PFA as the team and not PFA as the association.

Life After FIFA Suspension

Future Name of the Team
Following the currently ongoing suspension by FIFA and the new rules set by the Malaysia football league management, it is unlikely that the team will be known as Perlis FA after the year 2021.

With Malaysian football league demanding all teams competing in the country's top two leagues to be run as or changed to professional clubs by 2021, Perlis FA will have to use another name (than "Perlis FA") to compete in the Malaysia football league after their suspension. This was because from year 2021 onwards, any team not run as a club or run as an association (in other words, teams which are not privatised) are no longer allowed to compete in Malaysia's top two tier leagues.

Should the team had not fallen into financial crisis in 2019 and managed to get themselves privatised in 2020, the team was most likely be known as Perlis Northern Lions FC because in 2019, the team had used a crest which bears the name Perlis Northern Lions on their kits and official social media platforms, although they did not operate as a privatised football club at the time.

Stadium

Tuanku Syed Putra Stadium or Stadium Utama Kangar is a multi-purpose stadium in Kangar, Perlis, Malaysia.  It is currently used mostly for football matches. The stadium holds 20,000 people and opened in 1995.

Crest and colours
Perlis play their home matches wearing primarily yellow shirts, which sometimes had some touch of blue colour added on their designs. The team also play their home matches wearing either yellow or blue shorts and either yellow, blue or white socks. The colours for the kit worn by the Perlis FA state football team when they play their home matches are inspired by the colours of the Malaysian state of Perlis flag, which is yellow and blue.

Supporters
The Perlis FA state football team have a supporters' group known as the Ultras Perlis – Brigate Gialloblu (BGB Perlis) which was established in 2011. The supporters' group is known to be one of the most passionate set of supporters in the country. When attending matches played by Perlis FA, the group could be recognised by their black outfits while sporting yellow and blue scarfs (also known as the mafla in football). Claiming to support the team through thick and thin, they can also be seen chanting and singing to support their team from a section of the Perlis FA's home stadium, the Tuanku Syed Putra Stadium, (known to them as the 'curva') during Perlis FA's home matches.

Sponsors
The following are the sponsors of Perlis FA since 1995:–

Players

First-team squad

U-19 team

Management team

{| class="wikitable"
|-
! style="background:yellow; color:blue; text-align:center;"|Position !! style="background:yellow; color:blue; text-align:center;"|Name
|-
|-
|First team manager|| 
|-
|Assistant manager|| 
|-
|First team head coach|| 
|-
|Assistant head coach I|| 
|-
|Assistant head coach II|| 
|-
|Goalkeeper coach|| 
|-
|Fitness coach|| 
|-

Honours

Domestic

Friendly international
 Scissors Cup (India)
 Runners-up (1): 1995

Club records

Update on 29 November 2018.
*Note :
P = Played, W = Win, D = Draw, L= Loss, F = Goal for, A = Goal against, D = Goal difference, Pts = Points, Pos = Position

Source:

Individual player awards

M-League Golden boot winners

M-League Top goalscorer

President history

Vice-President history

Managerial history
Manager by Years (2008–present)

Coaches
Coach by Years (1985–present)

Football clubs under PFA supervision

Affiliated clubs within the association

  Perlis United F.C. (formerly known as KSK Tambun Tulang F.C.)
  Kuala Perlis F.C.
  Padang Besar

References

External links
 Official website

 
Malaysia Premier League clubs
Football clubs in Malaysia
Malaysia Cup winners
Football associations in Malaysia
Sports organizations established in 1963